Motoshi is a masculine Japanese given name. Notable people with the name include:

, Japanese baseball player and manager
, Japanese politician

Japanese masculine given names